Local elections were held in Cabuyao on May 9, 2016, within the Philippine general election. The voters elected for the elective local posts in the city: the mayor, vice mayor, and ten councilors.

Overview
Incumbent Mayor Isidro "Jun" L. Hemedes, Jr. decided not to run for mayor his son, Councilor Ismael Hemedes is running for Mayor under the Nacionalista Party. His opponents were Julio Alcasabas of the Liberal Party, Incumbent Vice Mayor Rommel Gecolea of PDP–Laban and Councilor Jaime Batallones of the United Nationalist Alliance.

Vice Mayor Rommel Gecolea is term-limited, Incumbent Mayor Jun Hemedes, Jr. is running in that position, His opponents were councilors Jose Benson "Sonny" Aguillo, son of Proceso and Nila Aguillo and Benjamin Del Rosario.

Candidates

 
  Running as an Independent candidate<noinclude>

Mayor

Vice Mayor

Councilors

|-bgcolor=black
|colspan=8|

References

2016 Philippine local elections
Elections in Cabuyao
2016 elections in Calabarzon